Joshua Bolma (born 10 April 2002) is a Ghanaian footballer whom New England Revolution traded up to take as the 4th pick overall in the 2023 MLS SuperDraft. He is a midfielder out of University of Maryland.

Early life
Bolma was born in Accra, Ghana. He moved from Ghana to the United States after graduating from the Rising Stars of Africa Academy in Ghana and was awarded a scholarship to attend the South Kent High School in Connecticut. He attended the University of Maryland where he played soccer for the Maryland Terrapins and was the Big Ten Freshman of the Year in 2021 and earned First Team All-Big Ten honors as both a freshman and sophomore. He was also only the fourth player in Maryland history to earn multiple first-team All-Big Ten honors.

Career
Entering the 2023 MLS SuperDraft, New England Revolution had the tenth overall pick. However they traded up with the San Jose Earthquakes to take Bolma as the 4th pick overall in the draft. They gave San Jose their No. 10 overall pick, $200,000 in 2023 General Allocation Money (GAM) and $50k GAM in 2024. Bolma signed on to a Generation Adidas contract and New England head coach Bruce Arena was quoted as saying “Josh Bolma is a really good, quick attacking player. He can play a number of positions and we are going to try him as a No. 8 in the center midfield.”

References

Living people
2002 births
Association football midfielders
Major League Soccer players
New England Revolution draft picks
New England Revolution players
Footballers from Accra
Ghanaian footballers
Ghanaian expatriate footballers
Maryland Terrapins men's soccer players
Ocean City Nor'easters players
Westchester Flames players
USL League Two players